Rachel Gould (born June 25, 1953 in Camden, New Jersey, as Rachel Field) is an American singer and teacher of Modern Jazz.

Life and works 
Gould studied cello and classical singing at Boston University from 1960 till 1971. From 1964 she worked as a backup singer.  She only appeared occasionally in the early 1970s, in the jazz clubs on the East Coast. Only after her divorce and moving to Germany did she establish herself as a jazz musician. She formed her own quartet and toured Europe. In 1979, she appeared in London with Chet Baker and played the much acclaimed album "All Blues". In the early 1980s, she performed at numerous European festivals, and worked with groups led by Ack van Rooyen, Lou Blackburn, Ferdinand Povel, Bobby Burgess, Michel Herr, Tom Nicholas, Dieter Reith and Erwin Lehn. In 1983 Gould sang for quite a while in the United States and, in New York City, with Woody Herman, Sal Nistico and Jake Hanna.

Upon her return to Germany, she presented at the Leverkusen Jazz festival the band "Breath & Bones". She continued her work in Germany from 1984 onwards, consisting mainly of teaching: first as a lecturer at the conservatories in Maastricht, Cologne, Mainz and Hamburg, before travelling in 1987 to the Swiss Jazz School. She later went on to work with Joe Haider and Benny Bailey. She played with Riccardo Del Fra on the album "A Sip of Your Touch" (1989), and, with his band, on a live album at the Montreux Jazz Festival 1991.

Since 1991, she has worked as a lecturer in jazz singing at the Royal Conservatory of The Hague (Koninklijk Conservatorium Den Haag).

Discography 
 Chet Baker & Rachel Gould All Blues (with Henri Florens, Jean Paul Florens, Jim Richardson, Tony Mann, 1979)
 The Dancer (with Dennis Luxion, Wilson de Oliveira, Rudi Schroeder, Clarence Becton released as LP 1982, as CD 1999)
 More of Me (with Allan Praskin, Larry Porter, Thomas Stabenow, Clarence Becton 1993)
 Rachel Gould & Luigi Tessarollo Tribute to Hoagy Carmichael (with Riccardo Fioravanti, Giovanni Gullino, 2007)

Literature 
 Martin Kunzler Jazz-Lexikon. Band 1. Reinbek 2002;

References

External links 
 Biography Jazzmasters.nl

Boston University College of Fine Arts alumni
1953 births
American jazz singers
Living people
Musicians from Camden, New Jersey